Hockey Geelong is the governing body for the sport of field hockey in the region of the city of Geelong, Australia.  HG coordinates men's, women's and junior local competition, as well as elite men's and women's squads in the Victorian State League conducted by Hockey Victoria.

History
The first hockey team in Geelong was founded in 1954, traveling to Melbourne to compete on a weekly basis.  The Geelong Men's Hockey Association was then formed in 1966, providing for local competition since then.

The association plays most of its matches on the synthetic pitch at Stead Park, Corio. Until 1992 Stead Park consisted only of grass fields, but in that year a sand-based synthetic turf was installed and stage 1 of the clubrooms constructed in their current locations. In 2008 this pitch was replaced with a hybrid (wet-dry) pitch. The Stead Park Master Plan (endorsed by the City of Greater Geelong on 28 January 2010) recommends the construction of a second synthetic pitch alongside the current one.

The facility at Stead Park was named the "Jim Kirk Pitch" in 2008 to honour the past president who was instrumental in the provision of both the 1992 and 2008 synthetic surfaces. The southern end of the ground is named the "Climpson Family End" and the northern is the "Burns Family End" in honour of two of the largest and most successful Geelong hockey families.

Awards
The association has a number of annual awards issued to members who demonstrate particular significance to Hockey Geelong as a whole. These include
 John Stephenson Memorial Award - most outstanding junior
 Best and Fairest Awards - each competition division, judged by 3-2-1 voting by the umpires after each match
 Hall of Fame - recognition of successful and dedicated players and officials
 Life Membership - awarded to exceptional, long term contribution to the Association both on and off the pitch
 Most Improved Umpire
 President's Shield - selected by the President of Hockey Geelong in that year, this is awarded to a club as recognition for contribution to the Association, development of juniors, or other criteria set by the President throughout the entire year

Local Competition Premierships

Clubs

Former/Non-Playing Clubs

References

External links
Hockey Geelong

Field hockey governing bodies in Australia
Field hockey in Victoria (Australia)
Sport in Geelong
Sports organizations established in 1966
1966 establishments in Australia